The Jonathan Eberhart Planetary Sciences Journalism Award was established by the Division for Planetary Sciences to recognize and stimulate distinguished popular writing on planetary sciences. The winning author (or authors) receives (or divide) a prize of $1,000, plus a citation. The award is named after science journalist Jonathan Eberhart.

Jonathan Eberhart Planetary Sciences Journalism Award winners

See also

 List of astronomy awards

References

Astronomy prizes